The O'Conor family (Middle Irish: Ó Conchobhair; Modern ) are an Irish noble house and were one of the most influential and distinguished royal houses in Ireland. The O'Conor family held the throne of the Kingdom of Connacht up until 1475. Having ruled it on and off since 967, they ruled continuously from 1102 to 1475. Moreover, the O'Conor parent house the Uí Briúin and Síol Muireadaigh ruled Connacht on many occasions – but not continuously – between 482 and 956. The house of O'Conor also produced two High Kings of Ireland, Tairrdelbach Ua Conchobair and his son Ruaidrí Ua Conchobair, the last High King of Ireland. The family seat is Clonalis House outside Castlerea in County Roscommon.

The current O'Conor Don is Desmond O'Conor (b. 22 September 1938) who lives in Rotherfield, East Sussex in England.

History
The Ó Conor Don is the head of a lineage which provided about one hundred Kings of Connacht, thirty Chiefs of the Name and two High Kings of Ireland, Tairrdelbach Ua Conchobair (1088–1156), and his son Ruaidrí Ua Conchobair (c. 1115–1198), the last High King.

During the late 14th century, the Ó Conor dynasty was grouped into two main divisions, one led by Toirdhealbhach Óg Donn Ó Conchobair, the other by Felim MacAedh Ó Conchobair. From these descended the families of Ó Conchubhair Donn anglicized as O'Conor Don and Ó Conchubhair Ruadh anglicized as O'Conor Roe (now extinct). The O'Conor family like all Gaelic Nobility followed Brehon law system up until the 16th century. Therefore, they did not follow primogeniture. The Kings, or Chiefs of the O'Conor family would be elected by a close kinship group. This did frequently result in bitter feuds and lead to civil wars within the Kingdom, therefore at times dramatically weakening the family's power in Connacht and in Ireland.

Descent from Turlough Mor O'Conor, Monarch of Ireland

Turlough Mor O'Conor, High King of Ireland and King of Connacht
Cathal Crobhdearg O'Conor, King of Connacht
Aedh O'Conor, King of Connacht
Cathal Dall O'Conor
Aedh MacCathal O'Conor
Ruaidri MacAedh O'Conor
Eoghan mac Ruaidri Ó Conor
Aedh O'Conor, King of Connacht 
Turlough O'Conor, King of Connacht (Ancestor of the O'Conor Don Sept) 
Felim O'Conor, King of Connacht (Ancestor of the O'Conor Roe Sept)
Felim O'Conor, King of Connacht
Aedh O'Conor, King of Connacht
Aedh Muimnech O'Conor, King of Connacht

The O'Conor Don line

 Turlough O'Conor, King of Connacht
 Aedh O'Conor, King of Connacht
 Turlough O'Conor, King of Connacht
 Aedh O'Conor, King of Connacht
 Ruaidhri O'Conor
 Turlough O'Conor
 Felim Geanach O'Conor, The Last King of Connacht
 Owen Ceach O'Conor, O'Conor Don
   Carbery O'Conor, O'Conor Don
 Dermot O'Conor, O'Conor Don
 Sir Hugh O'Conor, O'Conor Don of Ballintubber Castle (1541-1632). Member of Parliament. 
  Calvach O'Conor, O'Conor Don of Ballintubber Castle (1584–1655). 
  Hugh O'Conor, O'Conor Don of Ballintubber Castle (1617–1669). 
 Hugh O'Conor, O'Conor Don. 
 Charles O'Conor, O'Conor Don
 Hugh Og O'Conor of Castlerea.
  General Daniel O'Conor of Castlerea. He served in the Spanish Army. 
 Colonel Andrew O'Conor, O'Conor Don of Clonalis
  Daniel O'Conor, O'Conor Don.
 Dominick O'Conor, O'Conor Don of Clonalis
 Alexander 'Sandy' O'Conor, O'Conor Don of Clonalis.
 Thomas O'Conor.
 Brigadier General Sir Hugh O'Conor. 
 General Sir Thomas O'Conor. He was in the Irish Brigade. 
 Cathal O'Conor of Bellanagare (1597–1634).
 Major Owen O'Conor of Bellanagare (d. 1692). 
 Charles og O'Conor (d.1696)
  Denis O'Conor of Bellanagare (b. 1674). 
  Charles O'Conor of Bellanagre (1710–1791).
  Denis O'Conor of Bellnagare (1732–1804).
 Owen O'Conor, O'Conor Don of Clonalis and Bellanagare(1763–1831), Inherited the O'Conor Don on the death of his distant cousin Alexander 'Sandy' O'Conor, O'Conor Don of Clonalis in 1820.
  Denis O'Conor, O'Conor Don (1794–1847).
  Charles Owen O'Conor, O'Conor Don (1838–1906). 
  Denis Charles Joseph O'Conor, O'Conor Don(1860–1917). 
 Owen Phelim O'Conor, O'Conor Don (1870–1943). 
 Charles Hugh O'Conor of Lucan House, Co. Dublin (1872–1939).
  Rev. Charles Denis Mary Joseph Anthony O'Conor, O'Conor Don(1906–1981). As he was a Jesuit Priest, the title was inherited by his second cousin Denis Armar O'Conor.
 Roderick Joseph O'Conor (1872–1878).
 Denis Maurice O'Conor (1840–1883). 
  Charles William O'Conor (1878–1963).
  Denis Armar O'Conor, O'Conor Don (1912–2000). He inherited the title from his second cousin, the Rev. Charles O'Conor.
 Desmond Roderic O'Conor, O'Conor Don (born 1938).
  Phillip Hugh O'Conor (Born 1967).
  Eochy Jack O'Conor (Born 1993).
 Piers Montgomery O'Conor (Born 1995).
 Barley Josh O'Conor (Born 2006). 
 Kieran Denis O'Conor (Born 1958).
 Eoin Roderic O'Conor (Born 1992).
 Hugh Armar O'Conor (Born 1996).
 Rory Dominic O'Conor (Born 1963).
 Roderic Charles O'Conor (1913–1985).
  Brian O'Conor (Born 1957).
 Edward O'Conor. Agent to his father and then to his brother. 
 Dr Charles O'Conor(1764–1828). 
 Denis O'Conor (b.1770). 
 Roderick O'Conor (b.1772).
 Matthew O'Conor of Mount Druid (1773–1844). 
 Denis O'Conor of Mount Druid (d.1862)
 Charles Matthew O'Conor of Mount Druid. 
 Owen Denis O'Conor (b.1851).
 Denis A. O'Conor (b.1853).
 Arthur O'Conor of the Palace, Elphin (d.1870)
 Arthur Matthew O'Conor of the Palace, Elphin (b.1855).
 Charles Matthew O'Conor (b.1859).
Major Maurice Matthew O'Conor. 
 Martin O'Conor.
 Owen O'Conor.
 Matthew O'Conor.
 Charles O'Conor of Mount Allen (1736–1808)
 Denis O'Conor
 Thomas O'Conor (d.1865). 
 Charles O'Conor of New York
 Daniel O'Conor.
 Hugh O'Conor. 
 Rev. Roger O'Conor. He was a Roman Catholic priest.
 Rev. Matthew O'Conor. He was a Roman Catholic priest.
  Bryan Roe O'Conor. 
  Roger O'Conor. 
 Owen O'Conor (d.1766).
 Roderic O'Conor (d. 1781).
 Bernard O'Conor.
Thomas O'Conor(d.1832).
  Patrick O'Conor of Dun Dermott (d.1860). 
  Patrick Hugh O'Conor of Dundermot. (d.1877). 
Roderick Thomas O'Conor (1839-1858). Died in a shooting accident. 
Sir Nicholas Roderick O'Conor of Dun Dermott (1843–1908). 
Roderic O'Conor(1791–1879).
Thomas Roderick O'Conor (b.1849)
Thomas Nicholas O'Conor (b.1793)
Patrick O'Conor.
Major Thomas O'Conor of Miltown. 
Roderic O'Conor of Miltown.
 Dillon O'Conor
 Richard O'Conor.
  Roderic O'Conor of Miltown (1794-1868).
Roderick Joseph O'Conor (1835-1893)
 Roderic Anthony O'Conor (1860-1940). 
Joseph Owen Edward O'Conor.
Alfred John O'Conor.
Eugene O'Conor
Aylward O'Conor (1805–1877).
Roderick O'Conor
Bindon Blood O'Conor
William Frederick O'Conor
Dillon O'Conor
Aylward Owen Blood O'Conor (1842–1911).
Captain Aylward Robert O'Conor (1872–1952).
Lt.-Colonel Roderic Aylward O'Conor (1910–2003).
  Turlough Roderic Rosetti O'Conor (b. 1937)
 Roderic Arthur Allen O'Conor (b. 1960)
John Gabriel Turlough O'Conor (b. 1964)Reverend William Owen O'Conor (1878–1919). Captain Owen O'Conor. Rev. Bernard O'ConorThe O'Conor Roe line

Felim MacHugh O'Conor, King of Connacht (died 1316)
Hugh O'Conor, O'Conor Roe(died 1368)Owen Finn O'Conor (d.1362)Felim Cleireach O'ConorTurlough Roe O'Conor, O'Conor Roe (died 1425)
Teige O'Conor, O'Conor Roe(died 1464)Turlough O'Conor(d.1452)Dermot Roe O'Conor(d.1446)Rory O'Conor(d.1468)Teige O'Conor(d.1478)Conor O'Conor(d.1466)
Felim Finn O'Conor, O'Conor Roe(died 1490)
Hugh O'Conor, O'Conor Roe(died 1503)
Carbry O'Conor, O'Conor RoeTurlough O'Conor(d.1489)Teige O'Conor(d.1502)Con O'Conor(d.1493)Brian O'Conor(d.1489)Hugh O'ConorBrian Duv O'Conor(d.1466)Dermot O'Conor(d.1489)Donagh Dubhshuileach O'ConorCathal Duv O'ConorRory O'ConorOwen O'Conor(d.1466)Hugh Duv O'Conor (d.1466)Cathal Roe O'Conor(d.1451)
Teige Buidh O'Conor, O'Conor Roe(died 1534)Calvagh O'Conor of CloonakillyBrian Ballagh O'ConorTeige O'ConorHugh O'ConorTeige O'Conor (d.1693)Charles O'Conor (d.1692 in Germany)
Turlough O'Conor, O'Conor Roe
Hugh O'Conor, O'Conor Roe
Charles O'Conor, O'Conor Roe
Hugh O'Conor, O'Conor Roe
Roger O'Conor, O'Conor Roe He was the Governor of Civitavecchia. He was Living in 1734. After his death the title of O'Conor Roe became extinct.Roderic O'Conor(d.1552)
Teige O'Conor, O'Conor Roe (died 1592)Teige Boy O'Conor(d.1588)Charles O'ConorDonagh O'Conor(d.1631)Dermot O'ConorBrian O'ConorTeige O'Conor(d.1466)Brian Oge O'Conor(d.1482)Hugh O'ConorRory O'ConorBrian Balagh O'Conor(d.1418)Brian O'Conor(d.1487)
Teige O'Conor(d.1466)
Hugh O'Conor(d.1484)
Turlough Roe O'Conor(d.1452)
Turlough O'Conor(d.1478)
Rory O'Conor(d.1492)
Felim O'Conor(d.1468)
Donagh O'Conor(d.1478)
Teige O'Conor(d.1467)
Hugh Duv O'Conor(d.1467)
Rory O'Conor(d.1485)
Cathal O'Conor(d.1488)
Hugh O'Conor(d.1481)
Carbry O'Conor(d.1474)
Calvagh O'Conor(d.1497)
Teige Roe O'Conor(d.1497)

Key figures

Kings of Connacht
Conchobar mac Taidg Mór 872–882
Áed mac Conchobair 882–888
Tadg mac Conchobair 888–900
Cathal mac Conchobair 900–925
Tadg mac Cathail 925–956
Conchobar mac Tadg 967–973
Cathal mac Tadg d. 973
Cathal mac Conchobar mac Taidg 973–1010
Ruaidrí na Saide Buide 1087–1092
Tadg mac Ruaidrí Ua Conchobair d. 1097
Domnall Ua Conchobair 1102–1106
Tairrdelbach Ua Conchobair 1106–1156
Ruaidrí Ua Conchobair 1156–1186
Conchobar Máenmaige Ua Conchobhair 1186–1189
Cathal Carragh Ua Conchobhair 1190–1202
Cathal Crobderg Ua Conchobair 1202–1224
Aedh Ua Conchobair 1224–1228
Aedh mac Ruaidri Ua Conchobair 1228–1233
Felim mac Cathal Crobderg Ua Conchobair 1233–1256
Aedh Ó Conchobair 1256–1274
Murtogh Moynagh O'Conor 1274–1280
Magnus O'Conor 1288–1293
Hugh McOwen O'Conor 1293–1309
Ruaidri Ó Conchobair 1309–1310
Felim McHugh O'Connor 1310–1316
Rory na-bhFeadh Ó Conchobair 1316–1317
Toirdelbach Ó Conchobair first reign 1317–1318 second reign, 1324–1350
Cathal mac Domhnall Ó Conchobair 1318–1324
Hugh McHugh Breifne O'Conor 1342; died 1350
Aedh mac Tairdelbach Ó Conchobair
Ruaidri mac Tairdelbach Ó Conchobair 1368–1384

Chiefs of the name 
 Toirdhealbhach Óg Donn mac Aodha meic Toirdhealbhaigh, d. 9 December 1406.
 Cathal mac Ruaidhri Ó Conchobhair Donn, d. 19 March 1439.
 Aodh mac Toirdhealbhaigh Óig Ó Conchobhair Donn, d.15 May 1461.
 Feidhlimidh Geangcach mac Toirdhealbhaigh Óig Ó Conchobhair Donn, d. 1474 – last fully recognised King of Connacht.
 Tadhg mac Eoghain Ó Conchobhair Donn, d. 1476.
 Eoghan Caoch mac Feidhlimidh Gheangcaigh Ó Conchobhair Donn, d. 1485.
 Aodh Og mac Aodh Ó Conchobhair Donn
 Toirdhealbhach Óg mac Ruaidhri Ó Conchobhair Donn, d. 1503
 Conchobhar mac Eoghain Chaoich Ó Conchobhair Donn
 Cairbre mac Eoghain Chaoich Ó Conchobhair Donn, d. 1546
 Aodh mac Eoghain Chaoich Ó Conchobhair Donn, deposed 1550
 Diarmaid mac Cairbre Ó Conchobhair Donn, d. 1585
 Sir Hugh/Aedh Ó Conchobhair Donn, d. 1632
 An Calbhach mac Aedh Ó Conchobhair Donn, d. 1654 – popularly inaugurated king in 1643.
 Hugh Óg mac Aedh Ó Conchobhair Donn, d. 1662.
 Andrew O'Connor Don of Clonalis
 Dominick O'Connor Don of Clonalis, d. 1795
 Alexander O'Connor Don, d. 1820
 Owen O'Connor Don of Clonalis and Ballinagare, d.1831
 Denis O'Conor Don of Clonalis, 1794–1847
 Charles Owen O'Conor Don, 1838–1906
 Denis Charles O'Conor Don, 1869–1917
 Owen Phelim O'Conor Don, 1870–1943
 Fr. Charles O'Conor Don, 1906–1981
 Denis O'Conor Don, 1912 – 10 July 2000
 Desmond O'Conor Don (Former Chairman of the British-Chile Chamber of Commerce, former banker, resides in Sussex), b.1938

Other notable members of the family
Hugo Oconór (Spanish Army Officer and Governor of Texas)
Thomas O'Connor (Writer)
Charles O'Conor (Irish American Lawyer and Politician)
Nicholas Roderick O'Conor (British diplomat)
Roderic O'Conor (Artist)
Charles O'Conor (historian) (Historian)
Charles O'Conor (priest) (Priest and historical author)
Matthew O'Conor (Historian)
Denis O'Conor (Politician)
Charles Owen O'Conor (Politician)
Denis Maurice O'Conor (Politician)
Denis O'Conor Don (Prior Chief of the Name O'Conor, died 10 July 2000)

See also 
 Ó Conchobhair Sligigh
 Clan Muircheartaigh Uí Conchobhair
 Gaelic nobility of Ireland
 Chief of the Name
 Irish nobility
 Irish royal families
 Chief Herald of Ireland
 O'Connor Sligo, a royal dynasty ruling the northern part of the Kingdom of Connacht

References

Footnotes

 https://web.archive.org/web/20101128140613/http://ria.ie/publications/journals/eriu/online-access/57-(2007).aspx

Bibliography

 
 O'Connor, Roderic, A Historical and Genealogical Memoir of the O'Connors, Kings of Connaught, and their Descendants. Dublin: McGlashan & Gill. 1861.
 O'Donovan, John and the Rt. Hon. Charles Owen O'Conor Don, The O'Conors of Connaught: An Historical Memoir. Dublin: Hodges, Figgis, and Co. 1891

External links 
 O'Connor family pedigree at Library Ireland

Irish royal families
O'Conor dynasty
Irish medical families